John de Courcy (1160–1219), was a Norman English noble.

John de Courcy may also refer to:

John de Courcy, one of several men with the title Baron Kingsale in the Peerage of Ireland
John Fitzroy de Courcy, 31st Baron Kingsale (1821–1890), colonel of the 16th Ohio Infantry
John de Courcy, 35th Baron Kingsale (1941–2005), the Premier Baron of Ireland
John de Courcy Ireland (1911–2006), Irish historian and activist
John Edmund de Courcy, English bishop in Ireland